The Specialist Operations directorate is a unit of the Metropolitan Police of London, UK responsible for providing specialist policing capabilities including national security and counter-terrorism operations. The Specialist Operations Directorate is currently led by Assistant Commissioner Matt Jukes.

History
At its peak, Specialist Operations (SO) was a group of twenty specialist units, which were formed to give the Metropolitan Police a specialist policing capability. The SO designation was implemented in 1986 as part of Sir Kenneth Newman's restructuring of the Metropolitan Police Service. Most of the units designated SO units were already in existence, many of them as departments of C Division and its branches, and all were presided over by an Assistant Commissioner of Special Operations (ACSO).

In 1999 its Organised Crime Group took over residual work from the disbanded War Crimes Unit.  In 2010, ACSO co-directed Operation Guava, aimed at "a significant terrorist plot". The aim of this ACSO action was to prevent the establishment of a jihadist training camp in Kashmir on land owned by one of the suspects. Operation Guava resulted in the 2012 conviction of Usman Khan, who went on to perpetrate the 2019 London Bridge stabbing.

Structure
The Specialist Operations Directorate comprises three commands.

Protection Command 

Protection Command is led by a commander overseen by a deputy assistant commissioner. The command is responsible for protective security for high-profile governmental representatives of the United Kingdom or from the diplomatic community. As such it is analogous to the United States Secret Service or the Diplomatic Security Service. The command comprises two branches:

 Royalty and Specialist Protection (RaSP) provides personal protection for the royal family, the prime minister, government ministers, ambassadors, visiting heads of state and other individuals deemed to be at risk. RaSP also provide armed security at royal residences in London, Windsor, and Scotland. The Special Escort Group (SEG) is also operated by Special Operations.
 Parliamentary and Diplomatic Protection (PaDP) provides armed protection of embassies, missions and the Parliamentary Estate. They also provide residential protection for high-profile government ministers and are responsible for access control and security at Downing Street and New Scotland Yard. PaDP was formed in April 2015, with the merger of the Diplomatic Protection Group (SO6) and the Palaces of Westminster Command (SO17).

Security Command 
The Security Command is led by a commander overseen by the same deputy assistant commissioner as Protection Command. The command comprises two branches:

 Aviation Policing (SOAP) provides armed policing and security for all passengers and staff travelling through Heathrow and London City Airport. Gatwick, Stansted and Luton are policed by Sussex, Essex and the Bedfordshire Police respectively, as they are not located in the Metropolitan Police area.
 Protective Security Operations

Counter Terrorism Command 

The Counter Terrorism Command (CTC) is led by a commander overseen by a deputy assistant commissioner. The deputy assistant commissioner is the concurrent National Police Chiefs' Council Senior National Coordinator for Counter Terrorism Policing leading the network. The Counter Terrorism Command (SO15) is responsible for protecting London and the rest of the United Kingdom from the threat of terrorism. The command operates against the threat of terrorism at a local, national and international level, and supports the national Counter Terrorism Policing network (the regional counter terrorism units and the National Police Chiefs' Council). The Command also has the national lead for domestic extremism in support of the National Domestic Extremism and Disorder Intelligence Unit. The command also deals with sensitive national security investigations, such as Official Secrets Act enquiries, the investigation of war crimes and crimes against humanity, and politically motivated murders. It was created in 2006 through the merger of the Met's Anti-Terrorist Branch and Special Branch.

Structure until April 2015

Protection Command

Until April 2015 Protection Command was split into three units that provide protection for ministers, the royal family, and for foreign embassies, diplomats, and visiting dignitaries:
 Specialist Protection (SO1) Provided armed personal protection services for ministers, and public officials at threat from terrorism, including visiting heads of government and other public figures. In April 2015, it was merged with Royalty Protection, to form Royalty and Specialist Protection (RaSP).
 Royalty Protection (SO14) Provided protection of the monarch and other members of the Royal Family. The OCU is divided into Residential Protection, Personal and Close Protection, and the Special Escort Group (SEG), who provide mobile protection. In April 2015, it was merged with Specialist Protection, to form Royalty and Specialist Protection (RaSP).
 Diplomatic Protection Group (SO6) Provided protection for foreign missions in London, including protecting embassies, and the residences of visiting heads of state, heads of government and ministers. In April 2015, it was merged with the Palace of Westminster Division, to form Parliamentary and Diplomatic Protection (PaDP).

Security Command
Until April 2015, the Security Command consisted of three units that provide protection of parliament and the two airports within Greater London (Heathrow Airport and London City Airport), and organise security for major events in London.
 Palace of Westminster Division (SO17) Was responsible for the protection of the Houses of Parliament, and consisted of a team of 500 people. Officers were unarmed. In April 2015 it was merged with the Diplomatic Protection Group, to form Parliamentary and Diplomatic Protection (PaDP).
 Aviation Security Operational Command Unit (SO18) Became Aviation Policing (SOAP).
 Counter Terrorism Protective Security Command (SO20) Remains unchanged.

Counter Terrorism Command
Counter Terrorism Command (SO15) has remained unchanged.

Historical structure
Owing to continual restructuring of the Metropolitan Police, only a few of the original SO units still exist in their original form and still use the SO designation. Where the SO designation has been reassigned to another unit, the units are listed in order

 SO1 – Specialist Protection (now within the Protection Command)
 SO2 – Crime Support Branch/Department Support Group
 SO3 – Scenes of Crime Branch/Directorate of Forensic Services (now part of the Specialist Crime Directorate as SCD4 Forensic Services)
 SO4 – National Identification Service
 SO5 – Miscellaneous Force Indexes/Child Protection (now SCD5 Child Abuse Investigation Team)
 SO6 – Fraud Squad (now SCD6 Economic and Specialist Crime)
 SO7 – Serious and Organised Crime (renamed to Serious and Organised Crime Group, SCD7)
 SO8 – Forensic Science Laboratory
 SO9 – Flying Squad (now in SCD7, but retains same name and role)
 SO10 – Crime Operations Group (now SCD10 Covert Policing)
 SO11 – Criminal Intelligence Branch (renamed to Public Order Operational Command Unit, CO11)
 SO12 – Special Branch (merged with SO13 to create the Counter Terrorism Command)
 SO13 – Anti-Terrorism Branch (merged with SO12)
 SO14 – Royalty Protection Branch (now within the Protection Command)
 SO15 – Counter Terrorism Command
 SO16 – Diplomatic Protection Group (now within the Protection Command)
 SO17 – PNC Bureau (now the Police Information Technology Organisation)
 SO18 – Aviation Security/Airport Policing (now Aviation Security Operational Command Unit within Security Command)
 SO19 – Force Firearms Unit (Specialist Firearms Command, now within Met Operations)
 SO20 – Forensic Medical Examiners Branch

See also
 Central Operations
 Law enforcement in the United Kingdom
 Territorial Operations

References

External links
 

Metropolitan Police units
Counterterrorism in the United Kingdom